Edward Charles Kehr (November 5, 1837 – April 20, 1918) was an American politician and lawyer from Missouri.

Biography
He was born on November 5, 1837, in St. Louis, Missouri. Kehr pursued an academic course, studied law and was admitted to the bar in 1858, commencing practice in St. Louis. He was elected a Democrat to the United States House of Representatives in 1874, serving from 1875 to 1877, being unsuccessful for reelection in 1878. Afterwards, Kehr resumed practicing law in St. Louis, Missouri until his death there on April 20, 1918. He was cremated at the Missouri Crematory and his ashes were deposited in Hillcrest Abbey Crematory and Mausoleum in St. Louis.

External links

 

1837 births
1918 deaths
Missouri lawyers
Politicians from St. Louis
Democratic Party members of the United States House of Representatives from Missouri
19th-century American politicians
19th-century American lawyers